

Belgium
Belgian Congo – Pierre Ryckmans, Governor-General of the Belgian Congo (1934–1946)

France
 French Somaliland – Jean Victor Louis Joseph Chalvet, Governor of French Somaliland (1944–1946)
 Guinea – Jacques Georges Fourneau, acting Governor of Guinea (1944–1946)

Japan
 Karafuto – Toshio Otsu, Governor-General of Karafuto (1 July 1943 – 11 November 1947)
 Korea – Nobuyuki Abe, Governor-General of Korea (1944 – 12 September 1945)
 Taiwan – Rikichi Ando, Governor-General of Taiwan (December 1944 – October 1945)

Portugal
 Angola – Vasco Lopes Alves, High Commissioner of Angola (1943–1947)

Republic of China
 Taiwan – Chen Yi, Governor-General of Taiwan (25 October 1945 – May 1947)

United Kingdom
 Aden
 Sir John Hathorn Hall, Governor of Aden (1940–1945)
 Reginald Stuart Champion, Governor of Aden (1945–1950)
 Malta Colony – Edmond Schreiber, Governor of Malta (1944–1946)
 Northern Rhodesia – Sir Eubule John Waddington, Governor of Northern Rhodesia (1941–1947)

Colonial governors
Colonial governors
1945